Manfred Mann's Earth Band is the eponymous debut studio album by English rock band Manfred Mann's Earth Band, released in January 1972 by Polydor Records.

Marketing and sales 
Manfred Mann's Earth Band was first released in January 1972 by Polydor Records in the United States, where it sold modestly and charted for six weeks on the Billboard 200, peaking at number 138 on 18 March. The single "Living Without You" spent seven weeks on the Billboard Hot 100, reaching number 69 on 8 April. In the United Kingdom, the album was released on 18 February by Philips Records to lesser sales.

Critical reception 

The album was met with positive reviews from American critics. Henry Edwards of High Fidelity said the Earth Band had proved themselves greatly superior to other acts in the "British Blues Invasion of the Seventies" by displaying a dedication to the music rather than flaunting their individual abilities. He also applauded bandleader Manfred Mann's performances of "Part Time Man" and "I'm Up and I'm Leaving", writing that they possessed "that haunting, urgent quality that has always marked Mann not only as a quality rocker but also as a musician with serious intentions and the ability to realize them". Ramparts magazine called the album a respite from the "excessively abstracted psychedelic/hard rock" of the time, as well as an exceptional-sounding record that would prove to be "a landmark in the assimilation of new technology into rock without yielding to any impulse to make it a gimmick". At the end of 1972, Manfred Mann's Earth Band was named the third best album of the year in Robert Christgau's column for Newsday. The music critic applauded Mann's innovative synthesizer parts and both the "original and borrowed" lyrics, while calling the album "one of those future-rock records that will probably spawn no heirs, even by the group that made it". Reviewers in the UK were less receptive to the album, according to Robert Corich in his notes for its reissue.

Christgau later ranked the album number 17 on a decade-end list for The Village Voice, and described it as "an extraordinary cult record" that achieved rock's dichotomous "art-commerce" synthesis, something he said Mann had espoused since the early years of his music career. AllMusic critic J.P. Ollio called it "a completely satisfying album and one of the most underrated of the '70s", in which the Earth Band explored "arty and progressive directions" without succumbing to the weight of their own pretensions. Ollio highlighted the record's "hypnotic instrumentals", Mann's "exhilarating original songs", and the "three definitive covers" of Randy Newman's "Living Without You", Dr. John's "Jump Sturdy", and Bob Dylan's "Please, Mrs. Henry".

Track listing
Side one
"California Coastline" (Walt Meskell, Tim Martin) – 2:48
"Captain Bobby Stout" (Lane Tietgen) – 6:54
"Sloth" (Manfred Mann, Mick Rogers) – 1:27
"Living Without You" (Randy Newman) – 3:36
"Tribute" (Mann) – 5:32
Side two
"Please Mrs Henry" (Bob Dylan) – 4:32
"Jump Sturdy" (Dr. John Creaux) – 4:49
"Prayer" (Mann) – 5:41
"Part Time Man" (David Sadler, Mann) – 3:05
"I'm Up and I'm Leaving" (Mann, Sadler) – 3:11

 Sides one and two were combined as tracks 1–10 on CD reissues.
1999 CD bonus tracks
 "Living Without You" (Single version mono) (Newman) – 3:36
"California Coastline" (Single version mono) (Meskell, Martin) – 2:47
"Mrs Henry" (Single version mono) (Dylan) – 2:39

Personnel
Credits are adapted from the album's 1999 reissue booklet.

Manfred Mann's Earth Band
 Manfred Mann – Hammond organ, Minimoog synthesizer, backing vocals, lead vocals on “Part Time Man” and “I’m Up and Leaving”, production
 Mick Rogers – electric guitar, lead vocals
 Colin Pattenden – bass guitar
 Chris Slade – drums

Additional personnel
 David Mackay – producer
 Dave Hadfield – engineer, producer
 John Pantry – engineer
 Bloomsbury Group – design
 Bob Foster – photography

Certifications

References

External links
 
 Manfred Mann's Earth Band (2014 Creature Music remaster) (Adobe Flash) at Spotify (streamed copy where licensed)

Manfred Mann's Earth Band albums
1972 debut albums
Philips Records albums
Polydor Records albums
Bronze Records albums
Albums recorded at IBC Studios